Kambarasampettai is a neighbourhood of the city of Tiruchirappalli in Tamil Nadu, India. It is located on the National Highway 67 that connects Tiruchirappalli with Karur in the outskirts of the city.

Neighbourhoods and suburbs of Tiruchirappalli